A referendum on changing the electoral system to a two-round system was held in Romania on 25 November 2007, on the same date as the election to the European Parliament. The referendum was called by President Traian Băsescu on 23 October 2007 when the Parliament of Romania failed to meet a deadline set by him to pass these changes.

The precise question was:

While the system proposed by the president would mirror the French two-round electoral system, Prime Minister Călin Popescu-Tăriceanu has proposed a mixed member proportional system based on the German electoral system. The proposed legislation would also reduce the number of MPs by about 20 per cent.

While the Greater Romania Party (PRM) challenged the legality of holding the referendum at the same time as the EP election, the Constitutional Court of Romania decided on November 7 that it was not illegal.

Results

Although 81% of voters were in favour of the proposal, the low turnout of 26% meant that the referendum was invalid. Thus, the MMP proposal of PM Tăriceanu was used at the next elections instead.

References

Voting system referendum
Romania
2007
Electoral reform referendums
Electoral reform in Romania
Romania